Damias biguttata is a moth of the family Erebidae first described by Rothschild and Jordan in 1901. It is found in New Guinea and on Buru.

Subspecies
Damias biguttata biguttata
Damias biguttata buruana (van Eecke, 1929) (Buru)

References

Damias
Moths described in 1901